Baicang is a town in  Shaoyang County in eastern Hunan province, China, located  south of the county seat. , it has one residential community and 49 villages under its administration.

See also
List of township-level divisions of Hunan

References

Shaoyang County
Towns of Hunan